Harris Downey (born May 12, 1907 Baton Rouge, Louisiana - 1979) was an American short story writer and novelist.

Life
He graduated from Louisiana State University with a B.A. and M.A. He Served in the Air Force. He taught at Louisiana State University, where he knew Lyle Saxon.

His work appeared in Epoch, Prairie Schooner. Kenyon Review,

Awards
 1951 O. Henry Award

Works

Lyrics to LSU's Alma Mater

Anthologies

References

1907 births
1979 deaths
American short story writers
O. Henry Award winners